Rafael Delgado may refer to:
Rafael Delgado (author) (1853–1914), Mexican author
Rafael Delgado, Veracruz, Municipality in Mexico named after the author
Rafael Delgado (footballer) (born 1990), Argentine footballer
Rafael Delgado (The Young and the Restless), fictional character in The Young and the Restless soap opera